Peanut Butter Wolf Presents Stones Throw: Ten Years is a compilation album released by Stones Throw Records. The album celebrates the founding of Stones Throw ten years earlier. Many songs were taken from past Stones Throw releases to demonstrate growth over the 10-year period, however, there are also unreleased tracks found on this album. On January 23, 2007, this album has been re-issued as a 2/CD featuring the 2nd disc as a mix CD by J-Rocc of the Beat Junkies.

Track listing
 "The Red"
 Performed by Jaylib
 Produced by J Dilla
 "In Your Area"
 Performed by Peanut Butter Wolf
 Featuring Planet Asia
 Produced by Peanut Butter Wolf
 "Low Class Conspiracy"
 Performed by Quasimoto
 Produced by Madlib
 "America's Most Blunted"
 Performed by Madvillain
 Produced by Madlib
 "Two Can Win"
 Performed by J Dilla
 Produced by J Dilla
 "Knicknack"
 Performed by Wildchild
 Featuring Percee P, M.E.D.
 Produced by Madlib
 "Blind Man [L.A. Carnival Remix]"
 Performed by M.E.D., Cut Chemist
 Produced by Cut Chemist
 Remix produced by L.A. Carnival
 "Take Me"
 Performed by Fabulous Souls featuring Ira Raibon and Alicia Coates
 Produced by Ira Raibon
 "What About You? [Alternative Version]"
 Performed by Co Real Artists
 Produced by Genie Jackson
 "My World Premiere [12" Single Version]"
 Performed by Charizma, Peanut Butter Wolf
 Produced by Peanut Butter Wolf
 "Bang Ya Head"
 Performed by M.E.D.
 Produced by Madlib
 "Move, Pt. 2"
 Performed by Oh No, Roc 'C', J Dilla
 Produced by J Dilla
 "The Payback"
 Performed by Madlib
 Produced by Madlib
 "Falling"
 Performed by Dudley Perkins
 Produced by Madlib
 "A.V.E.R.A.G.E."
 Performed by Kazi
 Produced by Madlib
 "Be With"
 Performed by Koushik
 Produced by Koushik
 "Sunrays"
 Performed by Yesterdays New Quintet
 Produced by Madlib
 "Arrive"
 Performed by Aloe Blacc
 Produced by Aloe Blacc
 "Figaro [Madlib Remix]"
 Performed by Madvillain
 Produced by Madlib
 Remix produced by Madlib
 "Survivin' The Game"
 Performed by Homeliss Derelix
 Produced by G-Luv
 "Whenimondamic"
 Performed by Lootpack
 Produced by Madlib
 "Gary's In The Park"
 Performed by Gary Wilson
 Produced by Gary Wilson
 "Comrades & Dreams [Peanut Butter Wolf Mix]"
 Performed by Stark Reality
 Produced by Monty Stark
 Remix produced by Peanut Butter Wolf
 "Coast To Coast [Edan Edit]"
 Performed by Mr. Magic
 Produced by Mr. Magic
 Remix produced by Edan
 "Bootay"
 Performed by Funkaho
 Produced by Jeff Jank

Credits
 Executive producer: Peanut Butter Wolf

External links 
 Stones Throw Records official site

2006 compilation albums
Stones Throw Records compilation albums
Hip hop compilation albums